Isaac Mizrahi (born October 14, 1961) is an American fashion designer, actor, singer, television presenter and chief designer of the Isaac Mizrahi brand for Xcel Brands. Based in New York City, he is best known for his eponymous fashion lines. Mizrahi was previously a judge on Project Runway All Stars. In 2022 he played Amos Hart in the long-running Broadway revival of Chicago.

Early life
Mizrahi was born in Brooklyn, the son of Sarah, and Zeke Mizrahi, who was a children's clothing manufacturer. He is of Egyptian-Jewish and Syrian-Jewish descent. His maternal grandparents were Jews from Aleppo, Syria. He grew up as the youngest boy of his family in Midwood.  He bought his first sewing machine at the age of ten with money he had saved from babysitting that summer. At 15, he launched his own label, IS New York, with the help of a family friend. He attended Yeshivah of Flatbush, Fiorello H. LaGuardia High School of Music & Art and Performing Arts, and the Parsons School of Design.

Fashion career

Mizrahi presented his first collection in 1987 at a trunk show held by New York department store Bergdorf Goodman. The line immediately earned praise from fashion editors, prompting several top retailers to place orders. In 1989, he discussed his designs in an interview with Elizabeth Cannon. He described them as "controlled and glamorous", "elegant", "distilled, refined", inspired by decadence, and by the diversity of New York City. He also expressed his interest in appealing to a refined and exclusive clientele. In 1992, the French fashion house Chanel bought a stake in the company and began to bankroll its operations. Despite continued critical acclaim, sales were inconsistent; Bloomingdale's executive Kal Ruttenstein stated that Mizrahi had "good years and bad years." This volatility is mainly attributed to the designer's failure to establish a defined aesthetic or "Mizrahi look", as the frenetic designer was famed for changing gears each season. Though the company grossed $10–20 million a year, it never made a profit, and lost substantial amounts in its final four years of operation. Chanel eventually tired of the mounting losses and pulled financing in October 1998, forcing the closure of the company after the Fall 1998 collection. Among Mizrahi's fans and clients were Hollywood stars Nicole Kidman, Selma Blair, Julia Roberts, Sarah Jessica Parker, Debra Messing and Natalie Portman.

From 1995 to 1997, Mizrahi also designed a diffusion line, named "IS**C" in an act of "name effacement" intended to prevent dilution of the designer's full name.  This lower-priced line (in the $275 to $850 range) was meant to diversify the label from the very expensive Isaac Mizrahi collection, but it failed to gain traction and was shuttered in 1997.

Mizrahi returned to fashion in 2002 when he began designing another diffusion collection, Isaac Mizrahi for Target. The line was an enormous hit, and soon spread to cover accessories, bedding, housewares, and pet products. Sales volume tripled over five years to over $300 million and introduced the designer to mainstream America. The line was discontinued in 2008 as Mizrahi left for Liz Claiborne.

Mizrahi designed for Claiborne for only one year, 2009. Although advertising campaigns for his Claiborne work—featuring Mizrahi and women of all sizes, races, and ages—were found in major fashion magazines, the line was a disaster almost from launch. The clothes and accessories were very difficult to find, as only a few minor department stores, which were not found in major cities, carried Claiborne clothes. Gottschalks carried only a few pieces before declaring bankruptcy and liquidating, only weeks after Mizrahi's launch.  Furthermore, the few Liz Claiborne outlets that existed were also far from major cities and were found at outlet malls that were too remote for most customers to visit. As a result, in December 2009, the Liz Claiborne website was closed and rumors abounded that the company was bankrupt and in serious debt. As of fall 2010, Liz Claiborne clothes were sold at J.C. Penney and were not designed by Mizrahi.

In 2010, Mizrahi launched a label called IsaacMizrahiLIVE! exclusively on QVC.

In 2011, Mizrahi sold his brand to Xcel Brands, Inc. In addition to continuing the IsaacMizrahiLIVE! business on QVC, Xcel Brands launched various categories under the Isaac Mizrahi New York, Isaac Mizrahi Jeans, and Isaac Mizrahi brands. As of August 2012, footwear and denim have launched in Bloomingdale's and Nordstrom, and Mizrahi's first-ever fragrance, Fabulous, was set to debut September 6 on QVC, and in Bloomingdale's in October. Mizrahi remained a shareholder, creative director, and media personality for his namesake brand under Xcel.

Media
Mizrahi has made appearances in numerous television shows and movies since the 1990s. Including the 1993 Michael J. Fox comedy, For Love or Money, as an up-and-coming fashion designer, Julian Russell. In 1995, a movie was released about the development of his Fall 1994 collection called Unzipped. In Fall 2005, the Isaac show debuted on Style Network. He previously had a show on the Oxygen network.

Mizrahi appears on many of E!'s programs and has become well known for being flamboyant. He also appeared as himself in the episode "Plus One is the Loneliest Number" of the fifth season of Sex and the City, and in an episode of Spin City.  He guest starred on the American dramedy series Ugly Betty, in which he played a reporter for the cable channel Fashion TV in the episode "Lose the Boss".  He appeared as himself in The Apprentice season 1 (episode 6) as one of the celebrities supporting an auction for the Elizabeth Glaser Pediatric AIDS Foundation.  He also appeared on the public radio game show Wait Wait... Don't Tell Me! in 2006, saying, "Fat is the new black". He also appeared in a Season 4 episode of Gossip Girl.

Mizrahi has stated that he sees himself as an entertainer who can sing and act. On his Oxygen show, he sang jazz in a nightclub. He has also acted in films, appearing in Woody Allen's Small Time Crooks, Hollywood Ending and Celebrity.

Mizrahi was a contestant in the Jeopardy! Million Dollar Celebrity Invitational. While initially finishing second in a quarter-final game to Jane Curtin, as the highest scoring non-qualifier, he replaced semi-finalist Andy Richter, who had to drop out due to scheduling conflicts. He eventually lost to Michael McKean.

In 2006, Mizrahi designed pro bono the Smithsonian American Art Museum and the National Portrait Gallery's conservators' denim work aprons.

In 2009, Mizrahi began co-hosting the first season of The Fashion Show on Bravo with singer Kelly Rowland. Bravo launched the series to replace its former hit Project Runway, which then moved to the Lifetime network. Mizrahi returned as co-host in November 2010 for the show's second season, opposite a close friend and colleague, supermodel Iman, who previously hosted the Canadian version of Project Runway. A representative of the network indicated that Bravo believed Mizrahi's exciting presenting style would work well with newcomer Iman and the credibility that she brought as a genuine pioneer in the fashion world.

In 2012, Mizrahi participated in the debut season of Project Runway: All Stars as a head judge, alongside Marchesa designer Georgina Chapman, which aired on the Lifetime TV Network.

In February 2012, Mizrahi served as red carpet correspondent for Live with Kelly during the 84th Annual Academy Awards. The segment included interviews with Brad Pitt, Emma Stone, Rooney Mara, and Gwyneth Paltrow. It aired the morning after the Oscars, during a special episode of Live with Kelly.

In 2013, Mizrahi played himself in the final season of Showtime's The Big C.

Controversy 
In 2006 Mizrahi was the center of a minor scandal when he groped Scarlett Johansson's breast while conducting an interview for E! at the Golden Globes. In a 2013 George Stroumboulopoulos Tonight interview, Mizrahi attempted to minimize the incident, stating: "This wasn't nasty ... This was like, 'Are you wearing a bra? Are you wearing an underwire bra?' And she was like, 'Oh well.' "

Costume design
Mizrahi has worked as the costume designer for three Broadway revivals, including two plays (The Women (2001) and Barefoot in the Park (2006)), and one operetta (Threepenny Opera (2006)).

For his work on The Women, Mizrahi won the 2002 Drama Desk Award for Outstanding Costume Design.

Mizrahi was the costume designer for the Metropolitan Opera production of Orfeo ed Euridice (2008), directed by Mark Morris. Mizrahi has been a longtime collaborator with Morris in a partnership dating from 1997, when Mizrahi created costumes for a Morris film project with Yo-Yo Ma, Falling Down Stairs, from Ma's Inspired By Bach series.

Other projects
 He made a series of comic books called Isaac Mizrahi Presents the Adventures of Sandee the Supermodel, published by Simon & Schuster.
 He has also narrated the children's classic Peter and the Wolf at the Guggenheim Museum's Works & Process performing arts series since December 2007.
In 2008 he published How to Have Style (Gotham)
 In 2010, he designed the sets and costumes and directed Stephen Sondheim's A Little Night Music for Opera Theatre of St. Louis. It has been announced that in 2014, he designed  and directed Mozart's The Magic Flute for Opera Theatre of St. Louis.
 In 2013 Johnson & Johnson released a series of Band-Aid adhesive bandages with an Isaac Mizrahi theme.
 In 2016, Isaac Mizrahi: An Unruly History, Mizrahi's first career retrospective exhibition, opened at The Jewish Museum, New York. It was organized by Chee Pearlman, Guest Curator and Kelly Taxter, The Jewish Museum's Barnett and Annalee Newman Curator of Contemporary Art.Isaac Mizrahi: An Unruly History was on view from March 18 to August 7, and accompanied by a catalog published by Yale University Press, featuring essays by Kelly Taxter, Lynn Yaeger, and Ulrich Lehman, with an introduction by Chee Pearlman.
In 2019 he published his memoir, IM, (Flatiron Books)

Personal life
Mizrahi married his partner of six years, Arnold Germer, in a civil ceremony in New York City Hall on November 30, 2011.

In popular culture
After reading for Montgomery, he took part as Touchstone in Alan Parker's film Fame, set in the same High School of Performing Arts he had been attending at the time.

He appears briefly in the film Men in Black (1997) as one of the "celebrity aliens" granted asylum on Earth.

In 1996, an early MTV prank show, Buzzkill, used an actor to impersonate Mizrahi.

Mizrahi was a guest caller on an episode of Frasier and as himself in Sex and the City (Season 5, episode 5).

He appeared on Gossip Girl (Season 4, episode 6) as himself. He is seen at a party talking to Lily van der Woodsen.

In 2004, he appeared on an episode of The Apprentice during a challenge meant to raise money for the Elizabeth Glaser Pediatric AIDS Foundation.

He appeared in the fourth and final season of The Big C as himself.

He appeared on the QVC Shopping Channel in 2015 and proclaimed that Earth's Moon was in fact a planet. His co-host at the time, Shawn Killinger, vehemently denied this assertion and proclaimed that "the Moon is a star".

See also
 List of Jewish Americans
 LGBT culture in New York City
 List of LGBT people from New York City

References

External links

 Isaac Mizrahi on CFDA (Council of Fashion Designers of America)
 I saac Mizrahi archive of runway collections at Vogue
 
 
 

1961 births
American fashion designers
American fashion businesspeople
American Mizrahi Jews
American people of Egyptian-Jewish descent
American people of Syrian-Jewish descent
LGBT people from New York (state)
LGBT fashion designers
LGBT Jews
Living people
Jewish American artists
Jewish fashion designers
American people of Syrian descent
Parsons School of Design alumni
Participants in American reality television series
People from Midwood, Brooklyn
Yeshiva of Flatbush alumni
Fiorello H. LaGuardia High School alumni
21st-century American Jews